Marcelo Daniel Pecci Albertini (28 September 1976 – 10 May 2022) was a Paraguayan prosecutor. He prosecuted many high-profile criminal cases, involving Paraguayan and international drug cartels, as well as celebrities, including a 2020 case when Brazilian association football player Ronaldinho attempted to illegally enter Paraguay.

Personal life
On 30 April 2022, Pecci married Paraguayan journalist Claudia Aguilera Quintana. On the day of his death, she had told him that she was pregnant.

Death
Pecci and his wife Claudia were honeymooning in Baru, a tourist island off Cartagena, Colombia, when they were approached by two men on 10 May 2022. The two men shot Pecci three times, once in the face.
Pecci was interred in the Recoleta Cemetery, Asuncion.

Reactions to his death
Many prominent people reacted publicly to Pecci's death, including President of Paraguay Mario Abdo Benitez, who said on Twitter that "the cowardly murder of prosecutor Marcelo Pecci in Colombia (puts) all the Paraguayan nation in mourning. In the most energetic terms, we condemn this tragic event and reinforce our compromise of battle against organized crime. Our most sincere condolences (go) to his family members."

External links

1976 births
2022 deaths
21st-century Paraguayan lawyers
Deaths by firearm in Colombia
People murdered in Colombia
Paraguayan murder victims
Paraguayan people of Italian descent